The Process is a novel by Brion Gysin which was published in 1969. Gysin was a painter and composer, and also collaborated with Beat Generation author William S. Burroughs on many occasions. The Process was his first full-length novel.

Described by The Overlook Press (which published a posthumous edition in 1987) as "a powerfully psychological novel", The Process tells the story of a professor named Ulys O. Hanson who sets out on a pilgrimage across the Sahara Desert which turns out to be a hallucinatory experience.

The Process is notable not only for its evocative and poetic descriptions of the Sahara Desert and Sufi culture, but also for the history it documents. Most notably, Gysin's encounters with L. Ron Hubbard and The Master Musicians of Jajouka.

The Process features Thay and Mya Himmer, who are based on John and Mary Cooke, a couple who financed Gysin's 1001 Nights restaurant in Tangier.  John Starr Cooke gave Gysin the large emerald which features as the Seal of the Sahara.

1969 American novels
Doubleday (publisher) books
Novels set in Africa
Books about the Sahara